Paiyapathar or Paia Pathar is a village in Paschim Nabipur Union, Muradnagar Upazila, Comilla District, Bangladesh.

The name Paiyapathar is a compound of two Bengali words: paiya (meaning touched) and pathor(meaning stones), to thus mean "touched stones". According to the 2011 Bangladesh census, Paiyapathar had 540 households and a population of 2,740.

See also 
 List of villages in Bangladesh

References

Populated places in Cumilla District
Villages in Comilla District
Villages in Chittagong Division